Michael Laser (born September 14, 1954) is an American novelist, short story writer, and children's book author. His novels for adults include Eulogy (2022), My Impending Death (2015), Hidden Away (2013), Dark & Light: A Love Story (2007) and Old Buddy Old Pal (1999). His children's books include The Rain, a picture book (1997), 6-321, a middle-grade novel (2001), Cheater, a young adult novel (2008), and The Watermelon, a young adult novel (2012). He has published widely in literary magazines, including The Massachusetts Review and New England Review.

In 2022, he published The Word-Lover's Lexicon: A Whimsical Collection of Uncommon, Amusing, and Useful Words (Including the Ones You Meant to Look Up, But Didn't).

He has also published essays and articles in The New York Times, Salon.com, Newsday, the Los Angeles Times, and other periodicals.

Laser was born in Brooklyn, New York, and grew up in Queens, New York. He received a B.A. from the State University of New York at Binghamton in 1975, and a Master's from the Johns Hopkins University, where he studied in the creative writing program with novelists John Barth and Leslie Epstein, in 1977.

After living for 17 years in Manhattan, Laser moved with his wife to New Jersey, where they now live with their two children.

In 2018, Laser created collegewritingclinic.com, a website for college writing instructors. The website, along with a companion book, describes a method for helping students learn to write more clearly and gracefully.

External links 
 Author Website: www.michaellaser.com 
• College Writing Clinic 

1954 births
Living people
21st-century American novelists
American male novelists
Novelists from New York (state)
Jewish American novelists
American male short story writers
21st-century American short story writers
21st-century American male writers
21st-century American Jews